Tres Muskiteros is a 1951 Filipino film produced by Sampaguita Pictures.

Cast
Oscar Moreno
Fred Montilla
César Ramírez
Teresita Martinez
Norma Vales
Myrna Delgado
Rebecca del Rio
Gloria Romero
Carmencita Abad

External links

1951 films
1950s action films
Sampaguita Pictures films
Philippine action films
Philippine black-and-white films